The 1923–24 season was Port Vale's fifth consecutive season of football (18th overall) in the English Football League. Another season of slow and steady progress saw the club finish one point, and one place higher than the previous campaign. The club still lacked a regular goalscorer since selling Bobby Blood, however Wilf Kirkham made his debut, and goals came from all across the team. A still-standing club record was set on 5 April 1924, when Tom Holford played against Derby County at the age of 46.

The most notable incident in the campaign was the death of Tom Butler on 11 November 1923; he died from complications of a broken arm that he picked up whilst playing for the club.

Overview

Second Division
To strengthen the side, pre-season signings included: Stalybridge Celtic goalkeeper Tommy Lonsdale; Macclesfield Town 'penalty king' right-back Jack Maddock; Leeds United tough-tackling half-back Alf Dark; Bolton Wanderers winger Jack Lowe; Clyde's reliable forward Fred Howard; and Exeter City goal machine Harold Crockford. The kit for the season was picked – red jerseys with white shorts.

The season started positively, with two wins recorded, as well as a 14,000 home crowd. However a run of one point won in five games saw the club slump down the table. The arrival of Ireland international Louis Bookman for £250 from Luton Town couldn't reverse the side's fortunes. Their stats by the end of October were: played twelve, lost eight, failed to score in six. This miserable run included two defeats inflicted by rivals Stoke – the first time they had done the double over Vale in the league. Crockford agreed to have his contract cancelled, and talks began to try to re-sign Billy Briscoe. A young Wilf Kirkham made his debut against Leeds United, but failed to make much of an impact.

Their rotten form seemed to have been turned around when the "Valiants" earned a 1–1 draw with Clapton Orient on 3 November 1923. Tom Butler scored the goal, yet paid the ultimate price for his efforts. Near the end of the match he suffered a compound fracture in his left arm, and complications set in whilst he was at Hackney Hospital, causing septic poisoning; he died of lockjaw on 11 November. The club paid his widow the rest of his wages, and Stoke and numerous other clubs donated generously to provide the widow with a £700 benefit fund.

Back to football, and the club signed 41-year-old former England international Arthur Bridgett, despite the fact that he had spent several years in retirement. The winger impressed, and scored within ninety seconds of his debut. Later in the year Peter Pursell returned to the field for the first time in the season following an injury, and was like a new signing. Despite all this, Vale still suffered, and a heavy defeat at Old Trafford saw them stuck at the foot of the table. Turning to 1924, the Vale managed a run of six games unbeaten, and Briscoe was finally given his pay rise and so was re-signed from Congleton Town.

Despite Blackpool putting twelve past the Vale defence, the latter half of the season saw a massive improvement, as they lost just 6 of the 22 games. Briscoe and Kirkham provided the goals necessary to lift the club out of the relegation zone. On 5 April 1924, Tom Holford played against Derby County at the age of 46 – still a club record.

At the end of season, Vale finished in sixteenth place with 38 points, making it two seasons in a row in which the club bettered their previous season tally by one point and one place. Performing poorly at home, only bottom place Bristol City lost more home games, and only second-bottom Nelson conceded more at home. Vale were five points clear of relegation, but thirteen points off a promotion place.

Briscoe, Page, Kirkham, and Bridgett were the major goalscorers. Full-back Len Birks was an ever-present, and Tommy Lonsdale, Jack Hampson, and Jack Lowe were also key first team players. As well as the debut of Kirkham, Roger Jones also made his debut, starting his fourteen-year association with the club. At the end of the season the club let Peter Pursell leave for Wigan Borough, whereas Lonsdale and Hampson both retired due to injury.

Finances
Finances were once again worrying for the club and its supporters. A greatly reduced wage bill of £7,900 still necessitated fund raising activities from fans to keep the club alive. Arthur Prince was also sold to Sheffield Wednesday to raise cash. Season ticket prices ranged from £2 6s. 6d. to £3, 6s. 6d.

Cup competitions
In the FA Cup, Vale drew Third Division North Wrexham at the Fifth Round of Qualifying for the second successive season, and another disappointing defeat followed, this time at the Racecourse Ground, with the Welsh club running out 5–1 winners. The North Staffordshire Infirmary Cup went to Stoke, who beat Vale 1–0 at The Old Recreation Ground.

League table

Results
Port Vale's score comes first

Football League Second Division

Results by matchday

Matches

FA Cup

North Staffordshire Infirmary Cup

Player statistics

Appearances

Top scorers

Transfers

Transfers in

Transfers out

References
Specific

General

Port Vale F.C. seasons
Port Vale